Biendorf refers to the following places in Germany:

 Biendorf, Mecklenburg-Vorpommern
 Biendorf, Saxony-Anhalt